Green tree skink can refer to several skink species:

 Lamprolepis smaragdina, widespread from East Asia to Melanesia, otherwise known as "Emerald tree skink"
 Prasinohaema virens, endemic to New Guinea, otherwise known as "Green green-blooded skink"

Animal common name disambiguation pages